Cowboy Casino Interactive Poker is a video game developed and published by IntelliPlay in 1994 for the 3DO.

Gameplay
Cowboy Casino Interactive Poker is a game in which the player challenges five poker players from the Old West.

Reception
Next Generation reviewed the game, rating it one star out of five, and stated that "you don't learn much, or even enjoy playing the hands."

Entertainment Weekly gave the game a B- and wrote that "While the poker simulation Cowboy Casino has more bells and whistles than the competition — including sardonic interjections from live-action opponents — it can't escape the genre's main failing: You can never tell if the computer is dealing straight. This is fine if all you want to do is learn how to play the game, but experienced hands will find it unnerving to get four fifths of the way through a diamond flush, only to be busted by a 10 of clubs."

Reviews
CD-ROM Entertainment
SuperGamePower
Micromania

References

1994 video games
3DO Interactive Multiplayer games
3DO Interactive Multiplayer-only games
Casino video games
Poker video games
Video games developed in the United States
Western (genre) video games